New York's 118th State Assembly district is one of the 150 districts in the New York State Assembly. It has been represented by Robert Smullen since 2019.

Geography

2020s
District 118 contains a majority of Herkimer and Fulton counties, all of Hamilton County, and portions of Oneida and Montgomery counties.

2010s
District 118 contains a majority of Herkimer County, all of Hamilton and Fulton counties, and portions of Oneida and St. Lawrence counties.

Recent election results

2022

2020

2018

2016

2014

2012

References

118
Herkimer County, New York
Hamilton County, New York
Fulton County, New York
St. Lawrence County, New York
Oneida County, New York